Michel Mondésert (5 December 1916 – 16 April 2009) was a French prelate of the Roman Catholic Church.

Mondésert was born in Villefranche-sur-Saône, Rhône, and was ordained a priest on 11 July 1943.  Appointed Auxiliary Bishop to the Diocese of Grenoble-Vienne on 4 June 1971 and ordained bishop on 25 September 1971. He would remain bishop of Grenoble-Vienne until his retirement on 11 January 1992.

Mondésert was the Titular bishop of Apollonis from 1971 until his death.

External links
Catholic-Hierarchy
Diocese site of Versailles 

1916 births
2009 deaths
People from Villefranche-sur-Saône
20th-century Roman Catholic bishops in France